Kaitlin MacDonald (born November 26, 1998, in Brantford, Ontario) is a Canadian curler from Iqaluit, Nunavut. She currently plays second on Team Brigitte MacPhail.

Career
During her junior career, MacDonald competed in six Canadian Junior Curling Championships from 2015 to 2020 with skip Sadie Pinksen. The teams best finish was a 2–7 record in 2016, 2018 and 2020. They also represented Nunavut at the 2015 Canada Winter Games, finishing in eleventh with a 2–6 record.

In 2020, MacDonald, Pinksen and Alison Griffin teamed up with Ontario curler Lori Eddy for the 2020 Scotties Tournament of Hearts. Despite Eddy living in Ontario, she was added to the team as the territory's "import player", after being asked by Griffin. The team automatically qualified for the Scotties as no other team in the Territory decided to challenge them. The team finished with a 2–5 record, including a surprise win against Northern Ontario's Krista McCarville. Team Eddy represented Nunavut again the following year at the 2021 Scotties Tournament of Hearts, where they finished with a winless 0–8 record. Brigitte MacPhail joined the team for the 2021–22 season as their out-of-province player, replacing Eddy at the skip position. The team represented Nunavut at the 2022 Scotties Tournament of Hearts, finishing with a winless 0–8 record.

Personal life
MacDonald took accounting at the University of Prince Edward Island. She currently works as a finance officer for the Government of Nunavut.

Teams

References

External links

1998 births
Canadian women curlers
Living people
Curlers from Nunavut
Curlers from Ontario
Sportspeople from Brantford
People from Iqaluit
University of Prince Edward Island alumni